Lebyazhye is a rural locality in Lebyazhensky Selsoviet Rural Settlement, Kursky District, Kursk Oblast, Russia. Population:

Geography 
The village is located on the Seym River (a left tributary of the Desna), 92 km from the Russia–Ukraine border, 5 km south-east of Kursk, 8 km from the selsoviet center – Cheryomushki.

 Streets
There are the following streets in the locality: Shkolnaya and Zemlyanichnaya (252 houses).

 Climate
Lebyazhye has a warm-summer humid continental climate (Dfb in the Köppen climate classification).

Transport 
Lebyazhye is located on the European route  (Ukraine – Russia (Rylsk, Kursk, Voronezh, Borisoglebsk, Saratov, Yershov) – Kazakhstan), on the road of regional importance  (Kursk – Bolshoye Shumakovo – Polevaya via Lebyazhye), 2.5 km from the nearest railway station Klyukva (railway line Klyukva — Belgorod).

The rural locality is situated 8.5 km from Kursk Vostochny Airport, 115 km from Belgorod International Airport and 205 km from Voronezh Peter the Great Airport.

References

Notes

Sources

Rural localities in Kursky District, Kursk Oblast